The following highways are/were numbered 945:

Canada

United States